Trhová Hradská is a village and municipality in the Dunajská Streda District in the Trnava Region of south-west Slovakia.

History
In the 9th century, the territory of Trhová Hradská became part of the Kingdom of Hungary. The village was first recorded in 1235 by its Hungarian name as "Vasarut". Until the end of World War I, it was part of Hungary and fell within the Dunaszerdahely district of Pozsony County. After the Austro-Hungarian army disintegrated in November 1918, Czechoslovak troops occupied the area. After the Treaty of Trianon of 1920, the village became officially part of Czechoslovakia. In November 1938, the First Vienna Award granted the area to Hungary and it was held by Hungary until 1945. After Soviet occupation in 1945, Czechoslovak administration returned and the village became officially part of Czechoslovakia in 1947.

Demography 
In 1910, the village had 1337, for the most part, Hungarian inhabitants. At the 2001 Census the recorded population of the village was 2125 while an end-2008 estimate by the Statistical Office had the villages's population as 2254. As of 2001, 94,64 per cent of its population was Hungarian while 3,86 per cent was Slovak. Roman Catholicism is the majority religion of the village, its adherents numbering 90.40% of the total population.

Twinnings
The village is twinned with:
 Bőny, Hungary

References

External links
Local news selection at www.parameter.hu 
FC Vásárút, the local football club

Villages and municipalities in Dunajská Streda District
Hungarian communities in Slovakia